is a Japanese professional footballer who plays as a winger for  club Kashima Antlers.

Career statistics

Club
.

References

External links

Profile at Kashima Antlers

2001 births
Living people
Japanese footballers
Japan youth international footballers
Association football midfielders
Kashima Antlers players
J1 League players